The Geneva University Hospitals (HUG) is one of the five university hospitals of Switzerland and the largest one in the country. It is one of the largest hospitals in Europe.

First founded in 1535, the creation of the HUG dates back to 1995 as a merger of all public hospitals in Geneva. The HUG operates 8 hospitals in the Canton of Geneva as well as 40 outpatient clinics.

Description 

The Geneva University Hospitals includes 8 public hospitals, 2 clinics and 40 outpatient care centers with more than 11,000 employees (including 5,100 nurses). This hospital is not only a local hospital for the city of Geneva, but also the reference hospital for the rest of the canton, and together with the CHUV Lausanne, the reference hospital for French-speaking Switzerland.
It is attached to the University of Geneva Faculty of Medicine, and is one of five university hospitals in Switzerland; the others are in Basel, Bern, Lausanne and Zurich.

History 
In 1602, the General Hospital—created from the merger of seven medieval hospitals—was simultaneously a hospital, a hospice, an orphanage, a retirement home, an asylum and a reformatory.
After becoming cantonal hospitals in 1856, the HUG were turned into university hospitals in 1995 as part of the hospital reform required by authorities.
Today, the HUG are regional and reference hospitals for advanced medicine. They promote access to care for everyone and the development of centers of excellence in conjunction with the University of Geneva.

Historical dates:
 1602 - The general hospital is founded by combining seven hospitals that existed in the Middle Ages.
 1712 - Reconstruction of the General Hospital at the site where the Geneva Courthouse is located today.
 1856 - Cantonal Hospital opens following the separation of social assistance duties, assigned to the General Hospice, and medical assistance duties.
 1875 - Maternity Division is established on Prévost-Martin Street, and the construction of several buildings in the hospital district begins.
 1900 - Two asylums open outside the city: one in Loëx for terminal and non-contagious patients and one at the Bel-Air location, which becomes Belle-Idée, for the mental patients (psychiatry).
 1915 - The surgery facility is under construction, marking the development of a cutting-edge specialty in Geneva to secure a strong tradition.
 1943 - Phased construction of the Cluse-Roseraie location continues for a period of 50 years.
 1961 - The Children's Hospital opens to allow the Geneva pediatrics sector to develop an academic dimension that's linked to research and teaching.
 1972 - The Geriatric Hospital opens, now Trois-Chêne Hospital, which coincides with the emergence of medicine for the aging and research on the biology of aging.
 1992 - Commissioning of the Opera zone that is equipped with state-of-the-art operating rooms with laminar flow to fulfill the most advanced medical and technical requirements.
 1995 - The University Hospitals is created and organizes public hospitals into medical departments and promotes close collaboration with the health care system.
 2001 - Expansion work in Emergency, Maternity and the Children's Hospital is completed.
 2011 - Two projects launch: BatLab, dedicated to laboratories and research, and a new hospital building with rooms having 1 or 2 beds.
 2015 - BatLab opens [archive], a building dedicated to laboratories and research.
 2016 - Clinics in Joli-Mont (Geneva) and Montana (Crans-Montana (Valais)) join the HUG.
 2017 - The new Gustave Julliard hospital building opens.

Geography 

With a presence in the entire canton of Geneva, including around forty outpatient facilities, the HUG includes eight hospitals spread over six locations (Cluse-Roseraie, Beau-Séjour, Bellerive, Belle-Idea, Loex and Trois-Chêne) and two clinics: one in the canton of Geneva (Joli-Mont) and the other in Valais (Montana).
 The Main Hospital at the Cluse-Roseraie location combines the Lina Stern and Gustave Julliard Hospital buildings for short-stay services and has an emergency unit, an intensive care unit, operating rooms and state-of-the-art research facilities. It also includes a private ward. As of 2016, the six buildings at the Cluse - Roseraie location have been renamed (Lina Stern, Valerie Gasparin, Louise Morier, Jean-Louis Prévost, Gustave Julliard, David Klein).
 Maternity, leading Switzerland in the number of births, includes prenatal and post-natal hospitalization units, delivery rooms and an operating room. It also has a gynecology and obstetrics emergency department and houses the breast center.
 The Children's Hospital provides care to children from birth to 16 years of age for all conditions (including child psychiatric patients up to 18 years of age). It is the only center in Switzerland for children's liver transplants.
 Beau-Séjour Hospital [archive] admits people who need rheumatology care, rehabilitation treatments and neuro-rehabilitation therapies involving a wide range of professionals. It has a swimming pool, a climbing wall and rehabilitation equipment that combines robotics and IT.
 The Trois-Chêne Hospital [archive], in the heart of a large park, admits people whose health status requires hospitalization in geriatrics or rehabilitation treatments. This hospital has a complete medical imaging facility installed in 2015.
 The Loëx Hospital provides medical rehabilitation and accommodation with adapted care for people waiting for placement. It has a day hospital and provides consultations attached to community geriatrics at the location.
 The Bellerive Hospital [archive], formerly Cesco, a pioneer in palliative care in Switzerland, admits people whose health status requires hospitalization for medical rehabilitation care, for example to recover after neurological damage, and palliative care.
 The Belle-Idée psychiatric hospital houses part of the hospital units for general or specialized psychiatry, as well as the community geriatric unit.
 The Joli-Mont Clinic admits patients in rehabilitation and following medical or surgical care.
 The Montana Clinic specializes in rehabilitation in general internal medicine, psychosomatic and post-operative care, as well as chronic patient care.

Activity 

Geneva law entrusts the HUG with three main missions:
 Treatment: the HUG meets the needs of a community of 500,000 residents and handle 118,000 emergencies each year.
 Teaching: in collaboration with the University of Geneva Faculty of Medicine, the professional schools (particularly the HEDS, College of Health [Haute Ecole de Santé]) and the CIS (Interprofessional Simulation Center [Centre Interprofessionnel de Simulation]), the HUG train more than 900 physicians each year, (interns and clinic leaders) and around 203 apprentices (in the field of health and in administrative or technical fields). They also welcome more than 2,200 medical trainees, and health care professionals or others.
 Research: in conjunction with the University of Geneva Faculty of Medicine and with support from private and public foundations, the HUG run projects to improve treatments for patients.

Structure 
The HUG are organized into centers, departments, directorates, laboratories, divisions and units.
Medical departments:
 Department of Anesthesiology, Department of Pharmacology and Intensive Care Department
 Surgery Department
 Child and Adolescent Department
 Department of Gynecology and Obstetrics
 Imaging and Medical Information Sciences Department
 Department of Community, Primary Care and Emergency Medicine
 Department of Genetics and Laboratory Medicine
 Department of Internal Medicine, Rehabilitation and Geriatrics
 Clinical Neurosciences Department
 Oncology Department
 Department of Rehabilitation and Palliative Medicine
 Mental Health and Psychiatry Department
 Medical Specialties Department

Translational research laboratories:
 Laboratory associated with the Foundation for New Surgery Technologies (FNTC [Fondation pour Les Nouvelles Technologies Chirurgicales])
 Cellular Therapies Laboratory
The HUG is headed by a board of directors that delegates operational decisions to the chief executive officer of an executive committee that includes representatives from professional areas. Most management operations are assigned to departments.
The Rega-HUG partner base of the Swiss Rescue Air Guard is located at the Geneva Airport.

Personnel 
The HUG is one of the leading employers in the canton of Geneva. In 2017, 11,560 people worked in 180 different jobs at the HUG, 56% of them as care providers, 17% as physicians, 15% as administrative staff and 12% as technical and logistics personnel. Four out of ten employees worked part-time. Every year, around 1,000 professionals are hired.

Initial, continuing and post-graduate training 
In 2016, the HUG trained 742 in-house physicians, 160 WFH training clinic leaders, 1612 health professional trainees, 188 apprentices, 1,166 medical trainees, 338 other trainees, and more than 10,500 health care and social services professionals from the greater Geneva area in continuing education courses.

Associated institutions 
 Center for Biomedical Imaging (CIBM)
 University Centre of Legal Medicine (CURML)
 École romande de santé publique (ERSP)

Notable affiliates 
 Anne Beaumanoir,(1923-) neurophysiologist
 Gabrielle Perret-Gentil (1910-1999), Gynecologist and Obstetrician
 Julian de Ajuriaguerra (1911-1993), Psychiatrist
 Adolphe Franceschetti (1896-1968), Ophthalmologist
 Louis Jurine (1751-1819), Surgeon
 David Klein (1908-1993) Ophthalmologist
 Georges de Morsier (1894-1982), Neurologist
 Didier Pittet (1957- ), Specialist in Infectious Diseases and Epidemiologist
 Theodor Landis (1945- ), Neurology
 Barbara Polla (1950- ), Allergy Specialist
 Pierre Pollak (1950- ), Neurologist
 Jean-Louis Prévost (1838-1927), Neurologist
 Charles-Henri Rapin, (1947-2008), Geriatrics Specialist
 Daniel Schechter, (1962- ), Psychiatrist

Gallery

See also 
 University of Geneva

References 

Content in this edit is translated from the existing French Wikipedia article at :fr:Hôpitaux universitaires de Genève; see its history for attribution.

External links 

 

Teaching hospitals in Switzerland
Biosafety level 4 laboratories
Health facilities that treated Ebola patients